is a Japanese football player and he is the currently assistant manager of Japan Football League club Okinawa SV.

National team career
In June 2005, Maeda was selected Japan U-20 national team for 2005 World Youth Championship. At this tournament, he played 2 matches and scored a goal against Australia.

Club statistics
Updated to 23 February 2020.

References

External links

1986 births
Living people
Association football people from Nara Prefecture
Japanese footballers
Japan youth international footballers
Association football forwards
J1 League players
J2 League players
J3 League players
Sanfrecce Hiroshima players
Oita Trinita players
FC Tokyo players
Hokkaido Consadole Sapporo players
Gainare Tottori players
Okinawa SV players
Footballers at the 2006 Asian Games
Asian Games competitors for Japan